Sabine Liebner is a Munich-based pianist, specializing in a modern and contemporary repertoire.  She has recorded and performed works by Pauline Oliveros, Galina Ustvolskaya, Earle Brown, Giacinto Scelsi, John Cage, Morton Feldman, and others.  She was two-time winner of the Munich Music Prize.

References 

Year of birth missing (living people)
Living people
Women classical pianists
German classical pianists
German women pianists
21st-century classical pianists
Oehms Classics artists
21st-century women pianists